Jean-Yves Roy (born February 17, 1969) is a Canadian former professional ice hockey player. Roy was a member of the Canadian 1994 Winter Olympics ice hockey team, winning a silver medal. He would also play professionally in the National Hockey League with the New York Rangers, Ottawa Senators, and Boston Bruins. He currently coaches high school hockey for Notre Dame Academy in Hingham, Massachusetts and serves as an official for the Hockey East Association.

Awards and honors

Career statistics

Regular season and playoffs

International

References

External links 

1969 births
Living people
Binghamton Rangers players
Boston Bruins players
Canadian ice hockey right wingers
EC VSV players
HC Fribourg-Gottéron players
Ice hockey people from Quebec
Ice hockey players at the 1994 Winter Olympics
Kölner Haie players
Maine Black Bears men's ice hockey players
Medalists at the 1994 Winter Olympics
New York Rangers players
Olympic ice hockey players of Canada
Olympic medalists in ice hockey
Olympic silver medalists for Canada
Ottawa Senators players
People from Rosemère, Quebec
Prince Edward Island Senators players
Providence Bruins players
Undrafted National Hockey League players
Canadian expatriate ice hockey players in Germany
AHCA Division I men's ice hockey All-Americans